The Ulidiidae (formerly Otitidae) or picture-winged flies are a large and diverse cosmopolitan family of flies (Diptera), and as in related families, most species are herbivorous or detritivorous. They are often known as picture-winged flies, along with members of other families in the superfamily Tephritoidea that have patterns of bands or spots on the wings. Some species share with the Tephritidae an unusual elongated posteroapical projection of the anal cell in the wing, but can be differentiated by the smoothly curving subcostal vein. Two species, Tetanops myopaeformis and  Euxesta stigmatias, are agricultural pests.

Systematics
The Ulidiidae are divided into two subfamilies.

Subfamily Otitinae
Tribe Cephaliini Schiner, 1864
Acrostictella Hendel, 1914
Cephalia Meigen, 1826
Delphinia Robineau-Desvoidy, 1830
Myiomyrmica Steyskal, 1961
Myrmecothea Hendel, 1910
Proteseia Korneyev & Hernandes, 1998
Pterotaenia Rondani, 1868
Tritoxa Loew, 1873
Tribe Myennidini Kameneva & Korneyev, 2006
Acatochaeta Enderlein, 1921
Arborotites Barraclough, 2000
Callopistromyia Hendel, 1907
Dyscrasis Aldrich, 1932
Myennis Robineau-Desvoidy, 1830
Namibotites Barraclough, 2000
Neodyscrasis Kameneva & Korneyev, 2006
Oedopa Loew, 1868
Paroedopa Coquillett, 1900
Pseudodyscrasis  Hernández-Ortiz, 1988
Pseudotephritina Malloch, 1931
Pseudotephritis Johnson, 1902
Stictoedopa Brèthes, 1926
Stictomyia Bigot, 1885
Ulidiotites Steyskal, 1961
Tribe Otitini Aldrich, 1932
Ceroxys Macquart, 1835
Dorycera Meigen, 1830
Herina Robineau-Desvoidy, 1830
Hiatus Cresson, 1906
Melieria Robineau-Desvoidy, 1830
Otites Latreille, 1804
Tetanops Fallén, 1820
Ulidiopsis  Hennig, 1941
Otitinae incertae sedis
Curranops Harriot, 1942
Diacrita Gerstäcker, 1860
Haigia Steyskal, 1961
Idana Loew, 1873
Psaeropterella Hendel, 1914
Pseudomelieria Brèthes, 1921
Tetropismenus Loew, 1876
Tujunga Steyskal, 1961

Subfamily Ulidiinae
Tribe Lipsanini Enderlin, 1838
Acrosticta Loew, 1868
Acrostictomyia Blanchard, 1938
Aspistomella Hendel, 1909
Axiologina Hendel, 1909
Cenchrometopa Hendel, 1909
Chaetopsis Loew, 1868
Euacaina Steyskal, 1963
Eumecosomyia Hendel, 1909
Eumetopiella Hendel, 1907
Euphara Loew, 1868
Euxesta Loew, 1868
Heterodoxa J. R. Malloch, 1832
Hypoecta Loew, 1868
Lipsana Enderlein, 1938
Neoeuxesta Malloch, 1930
Notogramma Loew, 1868
Paraphyola Hendel, 1909
Pareuxesta Coquillett, 1901
Perissoneura J. R. Malloch, 1832
Polyteloptera Hendel, 1909
Pseudeuxesta Hendel, 1910
Siopa Hendel, 1909
Steneretma
Stenomyia Loew, 1868
Texasa
Ulivellia Speiser, 1929
Vladolinia Kameneva, 2005
Zacompsia Coquillett, 1901
Tribe Pterocallini Loew, 1868
Aciuroides Hendel, 1914
Apterocerina Hendel, 1909
Chondrometopum Hendel, 1909
Coscinum Hendel, 1909
Cymatozus Enderlein, 1912
Cyrtomostoma Hendel, 1909
Dasymetopa Loew, 1868
Elapata Hendel, 1909
Goniaeola Hendel, 1909
Lathrostigma Enderlein
Megalaemyia Hendel, 1909
Micropterocerus Hendel, 1914
Neomyennis Hendel, 1914
Ophthalmoptera Hendel, 1909
Paragoniaeola?
Paragorgopis Giglio-Tos, 1893
Parophthalmoptera?
Perissoza?
Plagiocephalus Wiedemann, 1830
Pterocalla Rondani, 1848
Pterocerina Hendel, 1909
Rhyparella Hendel, 1909
Sympaectria Hendel, 1909
Terpnomyennis Kameneva, 2004
Terpnomyia Hendel, 1909
Tetrapleura Schiner, 1868
Xanthacrona  Wulp, 1899
Tribe Seiopterini Kameneva and Korneyev, 1994
Homalocephala Zetterstedt, 1838
Syn.: Psairoptera
Pseudoseioptera Stackelberg 1955
Seioptera Kirby, 1817
Syn.: Ortalis Fallén, 1810
Tribe Ulidiini Macquart, 1835
Physiphora Fallén, 1810
Timia Wiedemann, 1824
Ulidia Meigen, 1826

Others

 Anacampta
 Blainvillia
 Califortalis
 Carlottaemyia
 Eupterocerina
 Euxestina
 Heramyia
 Hypochra
 Idanophana
 Macheirocera
 Meckelia
 Megaloprepemyia
 Metopocampta
 Myrmecomyia
 Ophryoterpnomyia
 Ortalis
 Paragorgopsis
 Phaeosoma
 Platyeuxesta
 Prionella
 Rhadinomyia
 Schnusimyia
 Systata
 Tephronota
 Terelliosoma
 Vespomima

References

External links

 Images of Ulidiidae from Diptera.info
  Family Ulidiidae at EOL
 Fauna Europaea
 Nomina Insecta Nearctica
 Delphinia picta University of Florida / Institute of Food and Agricultural Sciences
 Euxesta stigmatias, cornsilk fly University of Florida / Institute of Food and Agricultural Sciences

 
Brachycera families
Taxa named by Pierre-Justin-Marie Macquart